Sultan Hassan II Sri dhanmaru bavana mahaa radun was the fifth Sultan to ascend the Ranna Badeyri.  He was drowned while taking a bath in his bath pool.

References

15th-century sultans of the Maldives
Deaths by drowning